The Treaty of Perth, signed 2 July 1266, ended military conflict between Magnus VI of Norway and Alexander III of Scotland over possession of the Hebrides and the Isle of Man.

The Hebrides and the Isle of Man had become Norwegian territory during centuries when both Scotland and Norway were still forming themselves as coherent nation-states, and Norwegian control had been formalised in 1098, when Edgar of Scotland signed the islands over to Magnus III of Norway. In Norwegian terms, the islands were the Sudreys, meaning Southern Isles.

The treaty was agreed three years after the Battle of Largs in 1263. Michael Lynch has compared the treaty's importance with that of the Treaty of York of 1237. The Treaty of York defined a border between Scotland and England that is almost identical to the modern border.

Largs is often claimed as a great Scottish victory, but the Norwegian forces, led by King Håkon IV, were not fully committed to battle and the result was inconclusive.  Håkon had planned to renew military action the following summer, but he died in Orkney during the winter.  His successor, King Magnus VI, sued for peace and secured the Treaty of Perth.

In the treaty Norway recognised Scottish sovereignty over the disputed territories in return for a lump sum of 4,000 marks and an annuity of 100 marks.  The annuity was paid during subsequent decades. Scotland also confirmed Norwegian sovereignty over Shetland and Orkney.

See also 
 List of treaties

References

1266 in Scotland
Perth
Perth, Treaty of (1266)
Perth, Treaty of (1266)
Perth, Treaty of (1266)
Perth, Treaty of (1266)
Scottish–Norwegian War
History of Perth, Scotland